April's Motel Room was an American rock band from Simi Valley, California. The band released one studio album, Black 14, in 1994 through Immortal, an imprint of Epic Records.  Despite the album's generally positive reviews, its sales were low. The group's music has been described as a mixture of grunge and the Grateful Dead, with Washington Post writer Geoffrey Himes describing the voice of lead singer Tom Kelly as "a dead ringer for Eddie Vedder."

Members 
 Tom Kelly- Vocals
 Sam Nickell- Guitar
 Mike Hoolihan- Bass
 John Baffa- Percussion
 Aaron Zidenberg- Drums

Discography 
 Black 14 (1994, Immortal/Epic)

References 

Rock music groups from California
Epic Records artists
Alternative rock groups from California
American post-grunge musical groups